Garbi is a mountain in the western part of the Tadjourah Region in Djibouti. With a mean height of 1680 metres (5,512 ft), is the third highest point in Djibouti.

History
On 3 February 1982, an aircraft Nord 2501 Noratlas occupied by the 2nd Platoon of the 4th Company of the 2nd Foreign Parachute Regiment (2e REP), collided into Mont Garbi (Mount Garbi) and exploded. 36 men died, including that 27 from the Foreign Legion's 2e REP. Nobody survived. The official explanation – bad weather and incorrect barometric setting of the aircraft's altimeter.

The 4th Company of 2e REP was in Djibouti for the so-called short-duration mission, which commonly lasted 6 months at that time, to fulfil its duties in this African country as a French operational unit and to co-operate with the 13th Demi-Brigade of the Foreign Legion (13e DBLE), being placed there at that time.

Climate
Elevation is the major factor in temperature levels.

See also
Arrei Mountains

References

Garbi Kôma, Djibouti

Mountains of Djibouti